Crosskeys is an unincorporated community in Red River and Caddo Parishes, Louisiana, United States.

References

Unincorporated communities in Caddo Parish, Louisiana
Unincorporated communities in Red River Parish, Louisiana
Unincorporated communities in Louisiana